The Raincoats is the debut studio album by English rock band The Raincoats. It was released on 21 November 1979 as one of the first records issued by the London-based independent label Rough Trade. The album is perhaps best known for its off-kilter cover of "Lola" by the Kinks. The album's sixth track, "The Void", was covered by Hole in 1994.

In May 2010, the band performed the album in its entirety in London.

In 2020, Rolling Stone ranked The Raincoats at number 398 in its list of the 500 Greatest Albums of All Time.

Background 
In 1979, three of the four members were living in squats – Vicky Aspinall in Brixton, Gina Birch in Monmouth Road, Bayswater, where the band frequently rehearsed. The squatting culture informed the lifestyle and music of the band with an onus on improvisation and DIY. The band conveyed an egalitarian ethos in their early live performances: each member was positioned to have equal visual prominence on stage, and the band dressed in everyday punk fashion no different from the ordinary "street clothes" of the audience members.

Music and lyrics 
Simon Reynolds and Joy Press wrote that The Raincoats' debut "bends and buckles rock form but doesn't break it," describing the music as "ragged, homespun folk-punk, with its elastic rhythms, reedy vocals and rickety structures."  It has also been described as consisting of  "forward-thinking" experimental rock. "Life on the Line" had the original lyrics penned by the original guitarist, Ross Crighton, about a suicide at Ladbroke Grove underground station.

Release 
The Raincoats was re-released by Rough Trade in 1993 on CD, with liner notes by Nirvana frontman Kurt Cobain. The album was again re-released on 9 November 2009 on vinyl on We ThRee (the band's own label) in the UK and on the Kill Rock Stars label in the U.S. This edition included a free mp3 download and an extra track, "Fairytale in the Supermarket", as well as a special edition bonus CD, including live footage from 1978 and 1979 and a video of "Fairytale in the Supermarket".

Critical reception 

AllMusic praised the album, writing, "This music, even at its most dissonant, is stunning and captivating". In 1996, the critic Neil Strauss named it among the 100 most influential albums in "alternative" music in a Rolling Stone book on the subject. In 2020, Rolling Stone ranked the album at number 398 in their list of the 500 Greatest Albums of All Time. In his posthumously published Journals, Cobain's list of his top 50 favorite records features The Raincoats at number 21.

"An all-time great", The Raincoats is seen as a landmark in indie pop, new wave, and post-punk music, as well as one of post-punk's best albums. Charles Ubaghs, in articles for The Quietus and Tiny Mix Tapes, lauded the band and their album as exemplars of new musical exploration in the wake of the late-'70s punk movement. He dubbed it "a passionate new that screamed of possibility", noting the band's fusion of "oddball rhythms", use of the violin, and more that lead to "forward-thinking" music. Its impact on independent music has also been noted. BrooklynVegan saw the group's sound clearly in future DIY scenes and bands within them, including Beat Happening, Vivian Girls, and Electrelane. PopMatters credited them with shaping trends that would continue through bands Half Japanese and Beat Happening, like using lo-fi and "idiosyncratic" pop music elements. The Vinyl Factory saw the record set the 1990s musical movement riot grrrl's groundwork.

The Raincoats were referenced in the 2016 film 20th Century Women. Director and screenwriter Mike Mills praised their debut's "wobbliness", noting that the music's fragility gave it a "more human and inviting" aspect. He said that he attempted to feature these aspects into his writing.

Accolades

Track listing 
All songs written by The Raincoats, except where noted.

 Side A
 "No Side to Fall In" – 1:50
 "Adventures Close to Home" – 1:54 
 "Off Duty Trip" – 3:16
 "Black and White" – 2:29
 "Lola" (Ray Davies) – 4:04

 Side B
 "The Void" – 3:52
 "Life on the Line" (lyrics: Ross Crighton and The Raincoats) – 4:23 
 "You're a Million" – 3:54
 "In Love" – 3:06
 "No Looking" (lyrics translated and adapted by The Raincoats from a poem by Jacques Prévert) – 3:06

"Fairytale in the Supermarket" – 3:01, The Raincoats' first single, has been included as the opening track on all reissues of the album since 1993.

Personnel 
The Raincoats:
 Ana da Silva – vocals, guitar, keyboards 
 Gina Birch – vocals, bass guitar
 Palmolive – drums
 Vicky Aspinall – vocals, violin, guitar 
With:
 Lora Logic – saxophone on "Black and White"

Technical credits:
 Adam Kidron – engineer
 Geoff Travis, Mayo Thompson, and The Raincoats – producers
 Pang Hsiao-Li – cover painting
 Shirley O'Loughlin – photography

References

Citations

Sources

 
 
 
 
 
 
 
 
 
 
 
 
 
 
 
 
 
 
 
 
 
 
 
 
 
 
 
 
 
 
 

1979 debut albums
The Raincoats albums
Albums produced by Mayo Thompson
Albums recorded at Berry Street Studio
Rough Trade Records albums
DGC Records albums
Songs with feminist themes